Surg (also Romanized as Sūrg, Sūrag, and Soorag; also known as Sūg) is a village in Baqeran Rural District, in the Central District of Birjand County, South Khorasan Province, Iran. At the 2006 census, its population was 134, in 48 families.

References 

Populated places in Birjand County